Zaalim is a 1994 Indian crime drama film directed by Sikander Bharti and produced by G.P. Sippy. It stars Akshay Kumar, Madhoo, Vishnuvardhan, Ranjeet, and Alok Nath.

Plot
Three sons, a daughter, and the judge's wife all live together. While his daughter Kaamna and youngest son, Ravi, are of marriageable age, two of his sons, Vikram and Mohan, are married. Somnath had envisioned his sons becoming judges, doctors, and police officers. While Vikram is a surgeon, Mohan is a Police Inspector and Ravi is now studying law and on his way to become a lawyer and then a Judge like his dad. The family have a dark secret. Ravi is prone to losing his temper, so much so that he gets out of control, and has killed someone in his childhood. When Kaamna gets raped, the family is reluctant to tell Ravi. When they do, they convince him to control himself, while Mohan gets an arrest warrant for Vinod, Kaamna's molester. Things do not go smoothly in court as the matter is put off for several months and then Somnath and Kaamna are killed in a bomb explosion. Now Mohan and Vikram handcuff Ravi on their balcony while they finalize the funeral arrangements, and when they return Ravi is no longer there. And then the killings begin.

Cast
 Akshay Kumar as Ravi Pratap  
 Madhoo as Madhu
 Vishnuvardhan as Inspector Mohan Pratap  
 Navneet Nishan as Roopa 
 Arun Bakshi as Doctor. Vikram  Pratap 
 Aloknath as Judge Somnath Pratap 
 Padmarani as Mrs. Somnath Pratap  
 Ananya Khare as Kaamna
 Ranjeet as Ranjeet
 Mohan Joshi as Jaikaal
 Arjun as Vinod 
 Tiku Talsania as Madhu's Dad
 Akshay Kharodia as Sabeeha Item Bombay se

Soundtrack
" Bombay Se Rail Chali" - Anu Malik, Alisha Chinai  Item Akshay Kharodia, Sabeeha
"Chaar Din Ka Safar" - Suresh Wadkar, Kavita Krishnamurthy, Vinod Rathod
"Chaar Din Ka Safar (Sad)" - Suresh Wadkar
"Mubarak Ho Mohabbat Gungunati Hai" - Kumar Sanu, Alka Yagnik
"Mubarak Ho Mohabbat Gungunati Hai v2" - Kumar Sanu
"Pehle Hi Qayamat Kya Kam Thi" - Vinod Rathod, Alka Yagnik
"Roses Are Red" - Alisha Chinai, Abhijeet
"Soti Reh Gayee Saari Duniya" - Ila Arun

References

External links
 

1993 films
1990s Hindi-language films
Films scored by Anu Malik
Films about rape in India
Indian films about revenge
Indian crime drama films